Dolenje Jesenice is a small settlement in the Municipality of Šentrupert in southeastern Slovenia. The area is part of the historical region of Lower Carniola and is now included in the Southeast Slovenia Statistical Region.

References

External links
Dolenje Jesenice at Geopedia

Populated places in the Municipality of Šentrupert